First South is a community in the Canadian province of Nova Scotia, located in the Lunenburg Municipal District in Lunenburg County . First South is the first community south of Lunenburg.

References
 First South on Destination Nova Scotia

Communities in Lunenburg County, Nova Scotia
General Service Areas in Nova Scotia